Jack or Jackie Lomax may refer to:

Jack Lomax (American football)
Jack Lomax, character in Hellfighters (film)
Jack Lomax, on Ex On The Beach
Jackie Lomax, John Lomax

See also
John Lomax (disambiguation)